William Charlie Horton (July 21, 1876 – February 14, 1969) was a United States Marine and a recipient of the United States military's highest decoration, the Medal of Honor, for his actions during the Boxer Rebellion.

Horton served in the American Chinese Relief Expedition during the Boxer Rebellion as a private in the U.S. Marine Corps. He was awarded the Medal of Honor for his actions at Peking, China.

His Medal was issued on July 19, 1901. He is buried at Evergreen-Washelli Cemetery in Seattle, Washington.

Medal of Honor citation
Rank and organization: Private, U.S. Marine Corps. Place and date: Peking, China, July 21, to August 17, 1900. Entered service at: Pennsylvania. Born: July 21, 1876, Chicago, Ill. G.O. No.: 55, July 19, 1901.

Citation:

In action against the enemy at Peking, China, July 21, to August 17, 1900. Although under heavy fire from the enemy, Horton assisted in the erection of barricades.

See also

List of Medal of Honor recipients
List of Medal of Honor recipients for the Boxer Rebellion

References

Notes

1876 births
1969 deaths
United States Marine Corps Medal of Honor recipients
United States Marines
American military personnel of the Boxer Rebellion
Boxer Rebellion recipients of the Medal of Honor